Maleczewo  is a village in the administrative district of Gmina Ełk, within Ełk County, Warmian-Masurian Voivodeship, in northern Poland.

Notable residents
Fritz Reck-Malleczewen (1884-1945), author
Hermann Reck (1847-1931), politician

References

Maleczewo